Jean-Pierre Thommes (28 July 1890 – 20 October 1963) was a Luxembourgian gymnast who competed in the 1912 Summer Olympics.

In 1912, he was a member of the Luxembourgian team which finished fourth in the  European system competition team and fifth in team, free system team event. In the individual all-around, he finished 22nd.

References

External links
list of Luxembourgian gymnasts 
Jean-Pierre Thommes' profile at Sports Reference.com

1890 births
1963 deaths
Luxembourgian male artistic gymnasts
Olympic gymnasts of Luxembourg
Gymnasts at the 1912 Summer Olympics